Dilin Nair (born 16 November 1988), better known by his stage name Raftaar, is an Indian rapper, lyricist, dancer, TV personality and music composer associated with Hindi and Punjabi music.

He started his career as a dancer. He began his career in rap in 2008 with Lil Golu and Young Amli (now known as Ikka), recording songs and uploading them on social sites. He then started working with Yo Yo Honey Singh as a part of the Mafia Mundeer group. Raftaar later split from the group due to credit-related problems. He was supported by Ankit Khanna, who introduced him to the Punjabi music band RDB, who then signed him onto their label, Three Records. Soon after the split between the RDB members, Raftaar joined Manjeet Ral (now known as Manj Musik). He started his solo career in 2016 after getting signed to Zee Music Company.

He won the Best Urban Single award for "Swag Mera Desi" with Manj Musik at the Brit Asia TV Music Awards. In 2019, he started judging the reality shows MTV Hustle, Dance India Dance and Roadies.

Early and Personal life
Raftaar was born to a Delhi-based Malayali couple in Trivandrum (now Thiruvananthapuram), Kerala. Raftaar married Kamal Vohra, the sister of Indian television actors Karan Vohra and Kunal Vohra, in December 2016. They filed for a divorce in 2020 and have been living separately. The legal proceedings were delayed due to COVID-pandemic and were finalised on 6 October 2022.

Career

Raftaar became known after releasing his song "Swag Mera Desi" in 2013 with Manj Musik. The line "Ab yeh karke dikhao" from the song was a diss to Yo Yo Honey Singh. "Ab yeh karke dikhao" had already been used in Yo Yo Honey Singh's song "Party With The Bhoothnath" which led to a dispute between the two rappers in media. "Swag Mera Desi" won Best Urban Song at the Brit Asia TV Music Awards in 2014.

In 2017, Raftaar debuted in the Bengali music industry through the film One which featured singer Vishal Dadlani and Raftaar. He also produced and rapped a song for the Chaamp soundtrack. Raftaar has collaborated with Varun Dhawan for the second edition of Breezer Vivid Shuffle.

Discography

Albums and mixtapes
 WTF Mixtape: Vol. 1 (2013)
 Zero To Infinity (2018)
 Mr. Nair (2020)
 Hard Drive VOL.1(2022)
 PRAA (2023)

EPs

Singles and collaborations

Film music

Television roles

References

External links 

 

1999 births
Living people
Indian rappers
Singers from Delhi
Singers from Thiruvananthapuram
21st-century Indian singers
21st-century Indian male singers
Malayali people